Lone Tree Corners, also known as Lone Tree, is a former community in Bureau County, Illinois, United States, located east of Bradford. The community was established in the 1840s. In the 1920s, the last buildings in the community were demolished, save for the Lone Tree School; the school closed in 1942 but is still standing and is listed on the National Register of Historic Places.

References

Geography of Bureau County, Illinois
Ghost towns in Illinois
1840s establishments in Illinois